Tenchu: Dark Secret is an action-adventure stealth video game developed by Polygon Magic and published by FromSoftware in Japan and Nintendo worldwide for the Nintendo DS in 2006. It is also the first game in the Tenchu series to be released for the Nintendo system and not to have a Mature rating from the ESRB.

Gameplay
The game allows players to choose between Rikimaru and Ayame, two ninja assassins sent out to save a princess. There are more than 40 missions, as well as local wireless multiplayer combat and Wi-Fi capabilities which can be used to trade, buy and sell items around the world.

Development 

Tenchu was developed by Polygon Magic—their first Nintendo DS game—and published by From Software and Nintendo. It was first released in Japan on April 6, 2006, and later that year in North America (August 21) and the United Kingdom (November 24). Tenchu was released exclusively for video game retailers EBGames and GameStop in North America.

Reception

Tenchu: Dark Secret received "generally unfavorable" reviews, according to review aggregator Metacritic. In Japan, Famitsu gave it a score of one eight and three sevens, for a total of 29 out of 40.

Craig Harris of IGN wrote that the game's exclusivity to specific retailers was a mark of a specialty product. He said the game's quality was much lower than expected for a game published by Nintendo. Harris added that the game did not use its 3D environments and that a port of the original Tenchu game for PlayStation would have fared much better. He found the music repetitive and unfitting, the gameplay "stiff", and the graphics and story poor.

Notes

References

External links
Official website 

2006 video games
Action-adventure games
FromSoftware games
Nintendo DS games
Nintendo DS-only games
Nintendo games
Fiction about invasions
Nintendo Wi-Fi Connection games
Tenchu games
Video game spin-offs
Video games developed in Japan
Video games featuring female protagonists
Multiplayer and single-player video games